Art Bergstrom (died 2006) was an American football player and coach and collegiate athletic director. He served as the head football coach at Bradley University in Peoria, Illinois from 1948 to 1950. He also served as Bradley's athletic director from 1948 to 1956 before taking a job in the compliance office at the National Collegiate Athletic Association ((NCAA).

Head coaching record

College

References

Year of birth missing
2006 deaths
Bradley Braves football coaches
Bradley Braves athletic directors
Illinois College Blueboys football players
National Collegiate Athletic Association people
High school football coaches in Illinois